Javier Martón Ansó (born 6 May 1999) is a Spanish professional footballer who plays as a forward for Real Sociedad B.

Club career
Born in Tudela, Navarre, Martón was a Peña Sport FC youth graduate, and made his first team debut on 10 December 2016 by playing the last 18 minutes of a 1–1 Tercera División away draw against CD Egüés. In the 2017 summer, he moved to Real Sociedad and returned to the youth setup.

Martón returned to Peña Sport for the 2018–19 season, after agreeing to a loan deal. Upon returning to the Txuri-urdin, he played for the C-team before moving to Segunda División B side CD Covadonga on 9 September 2020, also in a temporary deal.

Martón scored nine times for the Asturians, but was unable to avoid relegation. He returned to Real Sociedad on 2 June 2021, and was assigned to the reserves in Segunda División; he renewed his contract until 2023 on 6 August.

Martón made his professional debut on 14 August 2021, coming on as a second-half substitute for goalscorer Jon Karrikaburu in a 1–0 home win over CD Leganés.

References

External links

1999 births
Living people
People from Tudela, Navarre
Spanish footballers
Footballers from Navarre
Association football forwards
Segunda División players
Segunda División B players
Tercera División players
Peña Sport FC footballers
Real Sociedad C footballers
Real Sociedad B footballers
CD Covadonga players